Etyiidae is a prehistoric family of dromiacean crabs only known from Cretaceous and a few Paleocene fossils.

Genera

In their A classification of living and fossil genera of decapod crustaceans (2009), De Grave and colleagues include seven genera in Etyiidae:
 Caloxanthus A. Milne-Edwards, 1864
 Etyus Mantell, 1822
 Etyxanthosia Fraaije, Van Bakel, Jagt & Artal, 2008
 Feldmannia Guinot & Tavares, 2001
 Guinotosia Beschin, Busulini, De Angeli & Tessier, 2007
 Sharnia Collins & Saward, 2006
 Xanthosia Bell, 1863

More recently, several the more genera have been described and the family split into two. The World Register of Marine Species recognises eight genera in Etyidae and four in Feldmanniidae as follows:

Etyidae Guinot & Tavares, 2001

Etyus 
Etyxanthosia 
Guinotosia 
Karyosia 
Rolerithosia 
Secretanella 
Sharnia 
Steorrosia 

Feldmanniidae Schweitzer, Feldmann, Franţescu & Klompmaker, 2012
Bretonia 
Caloxanthus 
Cantabroxanthus 
Feldmannia

References

Dromiacea
Prehistoric crustacean families
Cretaceous first appearances
Paleocene extinctions